Blind Willie Johnson (January 25, 1897 – September 18, 1945) was an American gospel blues singer, guitarist and evangelist. His landmark recordings completed between 1927 and 1930—thirty songs in total—display a combination of powerful "chest voice" singing, slide guitar skills, and originality that has influenced generations of musicians. Even though Johnson's records sold well, as a street performer and preacher, he had little wealth in his lifetime. His life was poorly documented, but over time, music historians such as Samuel Charters have uncovered more about Johnson and his five recording sessions.

A revival of interest in Johnson's music began in the 1960s, following his inclusion on Harry Smith's Anthology of American Folk Music, and by the efforts of the blues guitarist Reverend Gary Davis. Along with Davis, he has since been considered the dominant player of "holy blues" music, which conveyed religious themes in a blues idiom and often with the genre's style of guitar accompaniment.

Johnson's work has become more accessible through compilation albums such as American Epic: The Best of Blind Willie Johnson and the Charters compilations. As a result, Johnson is credited as one of the most influential practitioners of the blues, and his slide guitar playing, particularly on his hymn "Dark Was the Night, Cold Was the Ground", is highly acclaimed. Other recordings by Johnson include  "Jesus Make Up My Dying Bed", "It's Nobody's Fault but Mine", and "John the Revelator".

Biography

Early life and career
Johnson was born on January 25, 1897, in Pendleton, Texas, a small town near Temple, Texas, to sharecropper Dock Johnson and Mary King. His family, which according to the blues historian Steven Calt included at least one younger brother named Carl, moved to the agriculturally rich community of Marlin, where Johnson spent most of his childhood. There, the Johnson family attended church—most likely the Marlin Missionary Baptist Church—every Sunday, a practice which had a lasting impact on Johnson and fueled his desire to be ordained as a Baptist minister. When Johnson was five years old, his father gave him his first instrument—a cigar box guitar.

Johnson was not born blind, though he was impaired with the disability at an early age. It is uncertain how he lost his sight, but it is generally agreed by most biographers of Johnson that he was blinded by his stepmother when he was seven years old, a claim that was first made by Johnson's purported widow Angeline Johnson. In her recollection, Willie's father had violently confronted Willie's stepmother about her infidelity, and during the argument she splashed Willie with a caustic solution of lye water, permanently blinding him. Other theories have also been developed to explain Johnson's visual impairment, including that he wore the wrong spectacles, that he viewed the solar eclipse of August 30, 1905 that was partially observable over Texas or a combination of the two conjectures.

Few other details are known about the singer's childhood. At some point he met another blind musician, Madkin Butler, who had a powerful singing and preaching style that influenced Johnson's own vocal delivery and repertoire. Adam Booker, a blind minister interviewed by the blues historian Samuel Charters in the 1950s, recalled that while visiting his father in Hearne, Johnson would perform religious songs on street corners with a tin cup tied to the neck of his Stella guitar to collect money. Occasionally, Johnson would play on the same street as Blind Lemon Jefferson, but the extent of the two songsters' involvement with each other is unknown. In 1926 or early 1927, Johnson established an unregistered marriage with Willie B. Harris, who occasionally sang on the street with him and at benefits for the Marlin Church of God in Christ with Johnson accompanied on piano. From the relationship, Johnson had a daughter, Sam Faye Johnson Kelly, in 1931. The blues guitarist L. C. Robinson recalled that his sister Anne also claimed to have been married to Johnson in the late 1920s.

Recording sessions (1927–1930)

By the time Johnson began his recording career, he was a well-known evangelist with a "remarkable technique and a wide range of songs", as noted by the blues historian Paul Oliver. On December 3, 1927, Johnson was assembled along with Billiken Johnson and Coley Jones at a temporary studio that talent scout Frank Buckley Walker had set up in the Deep Ellum neighborhood in Dallas to record for Columbia Records. In the ensuing session, Johnson played six selections, 13 takes in total. Among the songs Johnson recorded in Dallas were "Jesus Make Up My Dying Bed", "It's Nobody's Fault but Mine", "Mother's Children Have a Hard Time", "Dark Was the Night, Cold Was the Ground", and "If I Had My Way I'd Tear the Building Down". He was compensated with $50 per "usable" side—a substantial amount for the period—and a bonus to forfeit royalties from sales of the records.

The first songs to be released were "I Know His Blood Can Make Me Whole" and "Jesus Make Up My Dying Bed", on Columbia's popular 14000 Race series. Johnson's debut became a substantial success, as 9,400 copies were pressed, more than the latest release by one of Columbia's most established stars, Bessie Smith, and an additional pressing of 6,000 copies followed. His fifth recorded song, "Dark Was the Night, Cold Was the Ground", eventually the B-side of Johnson's second release, best exemplifies his unique guitar playing in open D tuning for slide. For the session, Johnson substituted a knife or penknife for the bottleneck and—according to Harris—he played with a thumb pick. His melancholy, indecipherable humming of the guitar part creates the impression of "unison moaning", a style of singing hymns that is common in southern African-American church choirs. In 1928, the blues critic Edward Abbe Niles praised Johnson in his column for The Bookman, emphasizing his "violent, tortured, and abysmal shouts and groans, and his inspired guitar playing".

Johnson, accompanied by Harris, returned to Dallas on December 5, 1928, to record "I'm Gonna Run to the City of Refuge", "Jesus Is Coming Soon", "Lord I Just Can't Keep From Crying", and "Keep Your Lamp Trimmed and Burning". Two unreleased and untitled tracks were also recorded by Johnson under the pseudonym Blind Texas Marlin, but the master recordings of the session have never been recovered. Another year passed before Johnson recorded again, on December 10 and 11, 1929, the longest sessions of his career. He completed ten sides in 16 takes at Werlein's Music Store in New Orleans, also recording some duets with an unknown female singer, who is thought to have been a member of Reverend J. M. Gates's congregation. The blind street performer Dave Ross reported hearing Johnson performing on the street in New Orleans in December 1929. According to a story heard by the jazz historian Richard Allen, Johnson was arrested while performing in front of the Custom House on Canal Street, for allegedly attempting to incite a riot with his impassioned rendition of "If I Had My Way I'd Tear the Building Down".

For his fifth and final recording session, Johnson journeyed to Atlanta, Georgia, with Harris returning to provide vocal harmonies. Ten selections were completed on April 20, 1930. "Everybody Ought to Treat a Stranger Right" paired with "Go with Me to That Land" were chosen as the first single released from the session. However, the Great Depression had wiped out much of Johnson's audience, and consequently only 800 copies were pressed. Some of his songs were re-released by Vocalion Records in 1932, but Johnson never recorded again.

Later life and death
Johnson allegedly remarried, this time to Angeline Johnson, in the early 1930s, but, as with Harris, it is unlikely that the union was officially registered. Throughout the Great Depression and the 1940s, he performed in several cities and towns in Texas, including Beaumont. A city directory shows that in 1945, a Reverend W. J. Johnson—undoubtedly Blind Willie—operated the House of Prayer at 1440 Forrest Street, in Beaumont. In 1945, his home was destroyed by a fire, but, with nowhere else to go, Johnson continued to live in the ruins of his house, where he was exposed to the humidity. He contracted malarial fever, and no hospital would admit him, either because of his visual impairment or, as Angeline Johnson stated in an interview with Charters, because he was black. Over the course of the year, his condition steadily worsened until he died, on September 18, 1945. His death certificate reported syphilis and blindness as contributing factors.

According to his death certificate, he was buried in Blanchette Cemetery, in Beaumont. The location of the cemetery had been forgotten until it was rediscovered in 2009. His grave site remains unknown, but the researchers who identified the cemetery erected a monument there in his honor in 2010.

Musical style

Johnson is considered one of the masters of blues, particularly of the gospel blues style. Like his contemporary Blind Lemon Jefferson, Johnson channeled the expressiveness of the blues into his religious messages derived from hymnbooks. Samuel Charters, in the liner notes to the compilation album The Complete Blind Willie Johnson, wrote that, in fact, Johnson was not a bluesman in the traditional sense, "but here still is so much similarity between his relentless guitar rhythms and his harsh, insistent voice, and the same fierce intensities of the blues singers, that they become images of each other, seen in the mirror of the society that produced them".

An important aspect of Johnson's recordings was his mastering of the bottleneck guitar technique, which was immediately influential on Robert Johnson and Howlin' Wolf. He punctuated his selections with tonal control and a sense of timing, often using the guitar as a part of his harmonic phrasing, particularly on "Dark Was the Night, Cold Was the Ground". By most accounts, including one by the reputable blues guitarist Blind Willie McTell, Johnson used a knife as a slide, but other claims by Harris and the bluesman Thom Shaw also state he used a thumb pick or brass ring on his recordings. The music historian Steve Calt said of Johnson's style: "opposed to other bottleneck artists he varies the speed of his vibrato drastically, often speeding up as he slides into a note. He is also one of the few bottleneck artists with the ability to consistently sound 3 or 4 discreet melody notes upon striking a string once, a skill that reflects uncanny left-handed strength, accuracy and agility".

Johnson sang in a harsh, gravelly bass voice that was meant to be powerful enough to be heard by passersby on the streets. His vocal interplay was described by the blues writer Mark Makin as "fierce" and "not unlike the 'Hell and Damnation' of a Baptist preacher such as a fired-up Reverend A. W. Nix". On some instances in his recordings, Johnson also delivered vocals in his natural tenor voice. The only known influence on Johnson's singing style is the blind musician Madkin Butler, who, like Johnson, sang his religious message on the streets of Texas cities.

Legacy

Johnson's music was revived in the 1960s thanks in large part to his inclusion on Harry Smith's Anthology of American Folk Music in 1952 and the efforts of the blues guitarist Reverend Gary Davis, a highly regarded figure in New York's blossoming folk scene. As he taught Johnson's music to young musicians, groups and acts like the Soul Stirrers, the Staples Singers, Buffy Sainte-Marie, Fairport Convention, and Peter, Paul and Mary covered or re-interpreted his work. In November 1962, Bob Dylan recorded a rendition of "Jesus Make Up My Dying Bed", retitled "In My Time of Dying", for his self-titled debut album. Rock bands and artists of the 1970s also covered Johnson's songs, including Led Zeppelin, John Sebastian, and Eric Clapton. Alligator Records released the tribute album God Don't Never Change: The Songs of Blind Willie Johnson produced by Jeffrey Gaskill in 2016 with covers by various artists including Tom Waits, Lucinda Williams, Sinead O'Connor and Derek Trucks and Susan Tedeschi. The album was nominated for two Grammy Awards: Best Roots Gospel Album and Best American Roots Performance for Blind Boys of Alabama recording of "Mother's Children Have a Hard Time".

All of Johnson's released material has become easily accessible thanks to its preservation on compilation albums such as Blind Willie Johnson 1927–1930 and The Complete Blind Willie Johnson, among others. Samuel Charters was the first major blues historian to attempt to uncover more about Johnson's life, first documenting him in his 1959 book The Country Blues. In 1993, Charters corrected some factual inaccuracies in Johnson's biography in the liner notes to  The Complete Blind Willie Johnson. Other books related to Johnson include Shine a Light: My Year with Blind Willie Johnson and Revelation The Blind Willie Johnson Biography.

In 1977, Carl Sagan and a team of researchers were tasked with collecting a representation of Earth and the human experience for sending on the Voyager probe to other life forms in the universe. Among the 27 songs selected for the Voyager Golden Record, "Dark Was the Night, Cold Was the Ground" was chosen by NASA consultant Timothy Ferris because, according to Ferris, "Johnson's song concerns a situation he faced many times: nightfall with no place to sleep. Since humans appeared on Earth, the shroud of night has yet to fall without touching a man or woman in the same plight". Johnson's recording of "Dark Was the Night, Cold Was the Ground" was also selected by the Library of Congress as a 2010 addition to the National Recording Registry, which selects recordings annually that are deemed "culturally, historically, or aesthetically significant".
In 2017, the story of Blind Willie Johnson's inclusion on the Voyager probe was told in the multi-award-winning 2017 documentary series American Epic directed by Bernard MacMahon. The film was accompanied by a compilation album, American Epic: The Best of Blind Willie Johnson, featuring radically improved restorations of sixteen of Johnson's recordings.

See also 
 List of songs recorded by Blind Willie Johnson

References

External links

1897 births
1945 deaths
American blues singers
American blues guitarists
American male guitarists
American Protestants
Blind musicians
Columbia Records artists
Country blues singers
Gospel blues musicians
People from Beaumont, Texas
People from Marlin, Texas
Slide guitarists
Texas blues musicians
20th-century American guitarists
Guitarists from Texas
People from Bell County, Texas
African-American guitarists
20th-century African-American male singers
Deaths from malaria